The Autodrome Montmagny is a multi-track motorsport venue located in Montmagny (Canada), approximately 80 km east of Quebec City. The facility features a 3/8-mile-long oval track, a 2 km road course and a dragstrip.

Inaugurated in 1994, it was originally a one-half-mile oval dirt track (about 0.8 km). In 1998, it was paved and reduced to its present oval length. The road course was built for the 2014 season, using the oval track.

The racetrack was the property of the American stock car driver Ralph Nason for a decade before being sold to local owners in 2010. 
The track hosts stock car races (Quebec's ACT Series, PASS North, Sportsman Quebec) and drift competition (Drift Mania Canadian Championship). Road (car and motorcycle) and drag racing are planned for 2014.

External links

Autodrome Montmagny on thrirdturn.com

Paved oval racing venues in Quebec
Motorsport venues in Quebec
Sports venues completed in 1994
1994 establishments in Quebec
Montmagny, Quebec
Sports venues in Quebec